Ivan Chergev (born 21 March 1987) is a Bulgarian football forward.

External links

Bulgarian footballers
1987 births
Living people
Association football forwards
First Professional Football League (Bulgaria) players
PFC Beroe Stara Zagora players
Sportspeople from Stara Zagora